Boris Golitsyn may refer to:
Boris Alexeyevich Galitzine (also transliterated Boris Alexeyevich Golitsyn, 1654–1715), (1654–1714), Russian aristocrat
Boris Borisovich Golitsyn (1862–1916), Russian physicist
Boris Vladimirovitch Golitsyn (1769–1813), Russian aristocrat
Boris Andreevich Golitsyn (1766–1822), Russian nobleman